The Sharps & Hankins Model 1862 Carbine was a sliding breech action carbine made by Sharps & Hankins Co. in the 1860s and designed by Christian Sharps. The gun is a rimfire .52 caliber and was made in Philadelphia in a quantity of about 8,000. This firearm, patented on July 9, 1861 by Christian Sharps. The Navy version had a 24 inch barrel with a leather cover to protect the barrel from salt water. The Army version's barrel was blued. The Short Cavalry version had a 19 inch blued barrel.

See also
 Rifles in the American Civil War

References

American Civil War rifles
Carbines
Rifles of the United States
Single-shot rifles
Guns of the American West